Palmerston City is an inner suburb of Palmerston, Northern Territory, Australia, located within the City of Palmerston. Its postcode is 0830. It contains the Palmerston Shopping Centre, the City of Palmerston council offices, Frances Mira Mall, a sporting complex, a library and bus terminal. Its main core is bounded by University Avenue to the northwest, Chung Wah Terrace to the southwest, Rolyat Street and Temple Terrace to the southeast and Roystonea Avenue to the northeast. Every Friday night during dry season it host the Palmerston markets. The Palmerston markets is a large festive market which includes live music, swap stalls and food vendors.

References 

Palmerston, Northern Territory
Suburbs of Darwin, Northern Territory